Fernhill is a suburb west of Towradgi, in the City of Wollongong.

References

Suburbs of Wollongong